The 2018 Wexford Senior Hurling Championship was the 116th staging of the Wexford Senior Hurling Championship since its establishment by the Wexford County Board in 1889. The championship began on 20 April 2018 and ended on 21 October 2018.

St Martin's were the defending champions.

On 21 October 2018, Naomh Éanna won the title following a 2-11 to 0-13 defeat of St Martin's in the final at Innovate Wexford Park. It was their first ever championship title.

Results

Relegation play-off

Quarter-finals

Semi-finals

Final

References

Wexford Senior Hurling Championship
Wexford